Nata (nāṭa) is a rāgam in Carnatic music (musical scale of South Indian classical music), sometimes spelled Nattai. It is a janya rāgam (derived scale) from the 36th melakarta scale Chalanata. It is a janya scale, as it does not have all the seven swaras (musical notes) in the descending scale. It is a combination of the sampurna raga scale Chalanata and the pentatonic scale Gambhiranata. It is an auspicious raga, which is mostly sung in the early part of the concert.

There is a raaga named Nata in Hindusthani music as well, and another raaga named Shuddha Nat. But they are sung rarely, and have no association with the Nattai of Carnatic Music.

Structure of Lakshana 

Nata is an ASYMMETRIC rāgam that does not contain gandharam and dhaivatam in the descending scale. It is an sampurna-audava rāgam (or owdava rāgam, meaning pentatonic descending scale). Its  structure (ascending and descending scale) is as follows:

 : 
 : 

It is a vivadi raga. The notes used in this scale are shadjam, shatsruthi rishabham, antara gandharam, shuddha madhyamam, panchamam, shatsruthi dhaivatam and kakali nishadham in ascending scale, with dhaivatam and gandharam skipped in descending scale. For the details of the notations and terms, see swaras in Carnatic music.

Popular Compositions 
There are many compositions set to Nata rāgam. Many compositions in praise of Lord Ganesha are set to this raga. Here are some popular kritis composed in this ragam.

Sri Rajadhiraja  (Tanavarnam)
The first Pancharatna Kriti Jagadananda karaka and Ninne Bhajana by Tyagaraja
Swaminatha paripalaya, Mahaganapathim, Parameswara and Pavanathmajaagachcha  by Muthuswami Dikshitar
The first Thiruppavai Margazhi Thingal by Andal
Paahi Saure and Jaya Devaki Kishora by Swathi Thirunal
Umaiyor Bhagane by Papanasam Sivan
Veda Mathe Veda Vinuthe by Muthiah Bhagavathar
Pahi Nikhila Janani by Irayimman Thampi
Sarasijanabha Mam Pahi by Palghat Parameswara Bhagavathar
Sri Mahaganapathe Surapathe by Mayooram Viswanatha Sasthri
Kamalambike Mamava Sada by Jayachamarajendra Wodeyar
Karimukhavarada by G. N. Balasubramaniam
Sri Gajanana, Sri Padmanabham, Pranathosmi Devam and Re Re Manasa by Thulaseevanam
Sri Gananatha by Pallavi Sesha Iyer
Tanthi Ma Mukha by Koteeswara Iyer
Suryakodi Mamaprabhamakudei by Kutti Kunju Thankachi
Namo Namo Raghukulanayaka by Annamacharya
Jaya Jaya Janaki (1st Navaratna Malike), Vandisuvudadiyali by Purandaradasa
"Ananda Nartana Ganapathim"by Oothukkadu Venkata Kavi
"Sidhi Arul Siva Sakthi Balagane" by Nilakanta Sivan
Maha Ganapathim by Muthuswami Dikshitar

Film Songs

Language: Tamil

Related rāgams 
This section covers the theoretical and scientific aspect of this rāgam. chalanattai

Notes

References 

Janya ragas